Paley & Francis is a studio album by Paley & Francis (Reid Paley and Black Francis), recorded in Nashville in September 2010, and released in the UK & Europe on October 10, 2011 on Cooking Vinyl, and in North America on October 11, 2011 on Sonic Unyon.

The album was produced by Jon Tiven, and features Reid Paley and Black Francis on guitars and vocals, accompanied by Muscle Shoals legends Spooner Oldham on piano and David Hood on bass.

Paley & Francis debuted live in early September 2011 with club performances in Albany NY, Buffalo NY, and Hamilton Ontario (unannounced), and as one of the headliners of Hamilton Ontario's Supercrawl Festival. The band for these performances consisted of Reid Paley & Black Francis on guitars and vocals, Eric Eble (of the Reid Paley Trio) on bass, and Dave Varriale on drums.

The Paley & Francis album is slated for release as a vinyl LP in 2022 by Demon Music Group.

Track listing 
All music written by Black Francis and Reid Paley, lyricists noted below
"Curse" (Francis)– 3:45
"On the Corner" (Paley)– 2:18
"Magic Cup" (Francis)– 3:47
"Ugly Life" (Paley)– 3:55
"Seal" (Francis)– 4:29
"The Last Song" (Paley)– 3:38
"Crescent Moon" (Francis)– 3:26
"Deconstructed" (Paley)– 3:44
"Praise" (Francis)– 3:36
"Happy Shoes" (Paley)– 3:22

Personnel
Credits adapted from the album's liner notes.
Musicians
Reid Paley – lead and backing vocals, electric guitar
Black Francis – lead and backing vocals, acoustic and electric guitar
David Hood – bass 
Spooner Oldham – piano, organ, electric piano 
Harry Stinson – snare, tambourine, shaker, bells
Jon Tiven – tenor saxophone, harmonica, tambourine, "bass pillow", snare, handclaps, backing vocals
Jru Frazier – snare, tambourine
Patterson Hood – shaker
Technical
Jon Tiven – producer, engineer, mixing
Jake Burns – mixing engineer
Jim Demain – mastering engineer
Myles Mangino – photography
Butch Belair – photography

References

2011 albums
Black Francis albums
Collaborative albums
Cooking Vinyl albums